The 2009–10 season was Milton Keynes Dons' sixth season in their existence as a professional association football club, and their second consecutive season competing in Football League One.

As well as competing in League One, the club also participated in the FA Cup, League Cup and League Trophy.

The season covers the period from 1 July 2009 to 30 June 2010.

Season overview
It was manager Paul Ince's single season in charge of the club during his second spell as manager. He had replaced former manager, Roberto Di Matteo who had moved to take over the manager's role at West Bromwich Albion. Ince resigned in April 2010 blaming proposed budget cuts as a reason for his departure. Ince's assistant manager was Karl Robinson who would go on to replace him as manager in May 2010.

Top scorer for the season was Welsh striker, Jermaine Easter who was Ince's second singing for the club, in July 2009. Also signed by Ince in July 2009 was former Chelsea and Watford goalkeeper, Stuart Searle who was signed to serve as back-up goalkeeper to Willy Guéret.
Milton Keynes Dons finished in 12th position in League One, 20 points outside of the play-off positions. A long injury list and a poor disciplinary record undermined their chances of success. Although in fifth place and in the play-off places on Boxing Day, 2009, following a 4–1 win against Stockport County, they lost their next game, away to Huddersfield Town, and did not regain a place in the play-off positions for the rest of the season. They fell away badly from the league leaders towards the end of the season, failing to win any of their last 11 games. A season total of 236,663 people watched the team play their 23 home League One games giving an average attendance of 10,290 per match, the 7th highest in the league.

MK Dons reached the Third Round of the FA Cup before being beaten 2–1 in Milton Keynes by Burnley. Managed by Owen Coyle the creativity of Chris Eagles and the thrust in attack of Steven Fletcher were prominent features of the game. A goal from Fletcher and a penalty by Graham Alexander won the match with a single goal from MK Dons' Dean Morgan in response.

They played only in the First Round of the League Cup before being eliminated 1–4 by Swindon Town. The defeat was manager Ince's first since returning to the club. The opening goal for Swindon was a  lob of the goalkeeper, Willy Guéret by Jon-Paul McGovern.

They reached the Southern Area Final of the Johnstone's Paint Trophy before being beaten 4–1 on aggregate by Southampton.

Competitions

League One

Final table

Source: Sky Sports

Matches

FA Cup

Matches

League Cup

Matches

League Trophy

Matches

Player details
List of squad players, including number of appearances by competition.
Players with squad numbers struck through and marked  left the club during the playing season.

|}

Transfers

Transfers in

Transfers out

Loans in

Loans out

References

External links

Official Supporters Association website
MK Dons news on MKWeb

Milton Keynes Dons F.C. seasons
Milton Keynes Dons